Sebastian Winston Kohlhase (born 22 August 1942) was formerly a first-class cricketer, and is now a prominent sports administrator and businessman in Samoa.

Education
Kohlhase attended St Paul's College in Auckland, New Zealand.

Cricket career
Kohlhase played first-class cricket in New Zealand in the 1960s. He represented Northern Districts and Auckland as a medium pace bowler in a total of nine matches, scoring 107 runs at an average of 9.72 and taking 13 wickets at an average of 32.30.

Sports administration
Kohlhase is president of the Samoa International Cricket Association and the Samoan English Cricket Association.

His work has been recognised by the International Cricket Council in their annual Development Programme Awards. In the 2002 awards, he was named as volunteer of the year for the East Asia/Pacific region, and he was given the lifetime service award for the region in the 2006 awards.

In 2008, he acted as Chef de Mission for the Samoan team at the Beijing Olympics.

He is also a vice-president of Samoa Softball.

External links

References

1942 births
Living people
Auckland cricketers
Northern Districts cricketers
Samoan cricket administrators
People educated at St Paul's College, Auckland
Samoan cricketers
Samoan businesspeople